Samuel S. Phelps (1793–1855) was a U.S. Senator from Vermont from 1839 to 1851, and from 1853 to 1854. Senator Phelps may also refer to:

Charles A. Phelps (1820–1902), Massachusetts State Senate
James Phelps (congressman) (1822–1900), Connecticut State Senate
John M. Phelps (1821–1884), West Virginia State Senate
Phelps Phelps (1897–1981), New York State Senate